Petrie is a surname of Scottish origin which may refer to:

People
 Alexander Petrie (died 1662), Scottish minister
 Alexander Petrie (architect) (c. 1842–1905), Scottish architect
 Alistair Petrie (born 1970), English actor
 Andrew Petrie (1798–1872), Scottish-born builder, architect and first free settler of Brisbane, Queensland, Australia
 Andrew Lang Petrie (1854–1928), politician, builder and stonemason from Brisbane, Queensland, Australia
 Anthony Petrie (born 1983), Australian basketball player
 Archibald Petrie (1790–1864), Canadian politician
 Arthur Petrie (died 1787), Scottish bishop
 Bob Petrie (1874–1947), Scottish footballer with Sheffield Wednesday and Southampton 
 Charles Petrie (disambiguation), several people 
 Charlie Petrie (born 1895), English footballer with Sheffield Wednesday, Swindon Town and Southampton
 Daniel Petrie (1920–2004), American television and movie director
 Daniel Petrie Jr. (born 1952), American screenwriter (son of Daniel Petrie)
 Dave Petrie, Scottish politician 
 David Petrie (1879–1961), Scottish head of MI5
 Don Petrie (born 1922), Canadian soccer player and coach
 Donald Petrie, American film director
 Donald Petrie (botanist) (1846–1925), New Zealand botanist and teacher
 Doug Petrie, American television writer
 Drew Petrie (born 1982), Australian rules footballer 
 Ed Petrie (born 1978), English actor and comedian
 Eric Petrie (born 1927), New Zealand cricketer
 Flinders Petrie (1853–1942), English Egyptologist
 Geoff Petrie (born 1948), American basketball player and executive
 George Petrie (disambiguation), several people 
 Hay Petrie (1895-1949), Scottish actor
 Henry W. Petrie (1857–1925), American composer
 John Petrie (1822–1892), Scottish-born architect, builder and first mayor of Brisbane, Queensland, Australia
 John Petrie (footballer) (born c.1867), Scottish footballer with Arbroath
 Jon Petrie (born 1976), Scottish rugby union footballer 
 Lester Petrie (1878–1956), American politician
 Matthew Petrie (born 1978), Australian cricketer
 Milton Petrie (1902–1994), American retailer, investor and philanthropist
 Sir Peter Petrie, 5th Baronet (born 1932), British ambassador
 Rachel Petrie (born 1971), New Zealand field hockey player
 Ray Petri, originally Ray Petrie (born 1948), fashion designer and creator of the fashion house Buffalo
 Richard Petrie (born 1967), New Zealand cricketer
 Robert Methven Petrie (1906–1966), Canadian astronomer 
 Robin Petrie, American santouri and hammered dulcimer player
 Stewart Petrie (born 1970), Scottish footballer and coach in Australia
 Thomas Petrie (born 1831), Scottish-born Australian explorer, timber-getter and Aboriginal overseer
 Wendy Petrie, New Zealand television presenter

Fictional characters
 Petrie, a main character in The Land Before Time franchise
 Rob and Laura Petrie, principal characters of the American TV show The Dick Van Dyke Show
 Dr. Petrie, a foe of Fu Manchu
 Dr. Petrie, from The Mummy's Hand

Other
 Petrie, Queensland, a suburb in the Moreton Bay Region, Queensland, Australia
 Petrie™, an architectural and construction business established in 1840 in Queensland, Australia

See also
 Petri
 Petry
 Henry I. Patrie (1874–1935), New York state senator